The 1929 season of the Mitropa Cup football club tournament was won by Újpest FC in a two-legged final against Slavia Prague. This was the third edition of the tournament, and the first edition in which Italian clubs competed and Yugoslavian clubs did not compete. Clubs from Yugoslavia were barred from the competition after King Alexander declared a royal dictatorship on January 6 of that year, so Italy entered.

FIGC Qualifications
Italy was invited to join, but when the Mitropa began, the Final of the Italian Championship between Torino and Bologna was to play, so the FIGC decided for a playoff between their runners-up Milan and Juventus against two out of the three remaining most successful clubs of the country, Genoa and Inter. The runners-up had the home advantage.

Replay
Played in Genoa

Genova 1893 was drawn to participate in the Mitropa Cup together with Juventus.

Quarter-finals

|}

Semi-finals

|}

Playoff between Újpest FC and SK Rapid Wien resulted in 3-1 victory for Újpest FC.

Finals

|}

Finals

Top goalscorers

References

External links 
 Mitropa Cup results at Rec.Sport.Soccer Statistics Foundation

1929
1929–30 in European football
1929–30 in Austrian football
1929–30 in Italian football
1929–30 in Czechoslovak football
1929–30 in Hungarian football